A terrorist attack was carried out by the Jewish paramilitary group Haganah on the Christian-owned Semiramis Hotel in the Katamon neighborhood of Jerusalem during the 1947–1948 Civil War in Mandatory Palestine.

After suspecting that the Semiramis hotel was one of two Arab headquarters in Katamon, the Haganah planted a bomb there on the night of 5–6 January 1948. The mission was carried out by a team consisting of four men supported by ten riflemen. The explosion killed 24 or 26 civilians including at least one child. Among the dead were seven members of the Aboussouan family and Hubert Lorenzo, the 23-year-old son of the proprietor. The  Spanish vice-consul, Manuel Allende Salazar, was also killed in the attack.

According to Associated Press reports at the time a Haganah spokesman said that the Jerusalem hotel attack was executed because "the building was an important meeting place of Arab gangs, where arms were distributed to villages in the Jerusalem area." He continued, "Unfortunately, we cannot hit at the Arab band's (main) headquarters as it is secreted in a mosque."

The attack was harshly condemned by the British authorities, and David Ben-Gurion sacked Mishael Shaham, the Haganah officer responsible for the Jerusalem sector, replacing him with David Shaltiel. According to John B. Quigley, the hotel was not a military headquarters and the British authorities denounced the attack as the "wholesale murder of innocent people." Ilan Pappé and J. Bowyer Bell attribute the bombing to the Irgun.

Prior to the bombing, the distinctive white jeep of Abd al-Qadir al-Husayni, commander of Jerusalem's Arab forces, had been seen in the hotel driveway.  

In O Jerusalem!, Dominique Lapierre and Larry Collins write that Mishael Shaham, the Haganah leader who organised the bombing, had been sent to Jerusalem to stop the flow of beleaguered Jews retreating from mixed areas of Jerusalem to the Jewish areas. It was thought that 'a major blow in Arab Katamon ... might force the Arabs out of the quarter and change the psychological climate in the city'. Shaham asked "Where is the main Arab headquarters?".

References

Bibliography

Mass murder in 1948
Explosions in 1948
Haganah
Massacres in Mandatory Palestine
Terrorist incidents in Jerusalem
Zionist terrorism
1948 in Mandatory Palestine
20th century in Jerusalem
Attacks on hotels in Asia
Hotel bombings
January 1948 events in Asia
1940s in Jerusalem
Katamon